European Cultural Month is an event created by the European Union to promote culture. It is similar to the European City of Culture, but lasting for a shorter time and intended mainly for the Central and Eastern European countries. It was launched in 1990.  

The event has currently been suspended. It is possible that it may resume, but would only take place in European cities not in countries which are members of the EU, which are therefore ineligible to be nominated as European city of culture.

It is not to be confused with European Month of Culture, an initiative of the EU Delegation to the United States, which has run every May since 2013.

References

Cultural policies of the European Union